The 1961 South American Championships in Athletics  were held in Lima, Peru, between 20 and 28 May.

Medal summary

Men's events

Women's events

Medal table

External links
 Men Results – GBR Athletics
 Women Results – GBR Athletics
 Medallists

S
South American Championships in Athletics
Sports competitions in Lima
International athletics competitions hosted by Peru
1961 in South American sport
1961 in Peruvian sport
May 1961 sports events in South America